Kuryluk is the Polish language spelling of the Ukrainian-language surname Курилюк (Kuriliuk/Kurilyuk/Kuryliuk/Kurylyuk).

The surname may refer to:

Ewa Kuryluk (born 1946), Polish artist
Jadwiga Kuryluk (1912-1995), Polish actress
Karol Kuryluk (1910-1967), Polish journalist, editor, activist, politician and diplomat
Maria Kuryluk (1917-2001), Polish poet, writer, translator, and amateur pianist
Merve Kuryluk (born 1937), Canadian hockey player

See also
 

Polish-language surnames
Ukrainian-language surnames